Campichoetidae is a small family of acalyptrate Diptera with only one genus Campichoeta Macquart, 1835. They are regarded by most authors as Diastatidae as subfamily Campichoetinae.

References

 McAlpine, J. F. 1962. A revision of the genus Campichoeta Macquart (Diptera: Diastatidae).Can. Entomol. 94:1-10.

External links
Images at Dipera.info
Dipterists Forum Family description.

 
Brachycera families
Ephydroidea